Marpha brandy is a type of fruit brandy produced in the Marpha village of Mustang district in Nepal. It is manufactured from a variety of local fruits such as pear, apricot, apple, etc. and is mostly made by the Thakali people—an ethnic group indigenous to Mustang region. Its strength is around 42% ABV (Alcohol by volume).

Manufacturing process 
Marpha village of Mustang region of Nepal is suitable for growing various types of fruits. Fruits such as pear, apricot and apple are produced in large quantity in the region. The fruits produced are used to make various items such as preserves, wine, brandy and dried fruit. 

The plucked fruits are washed and kept in a barrel for a week. After a week, the pulp is separated from the skin and the pulp is used to produce wine whereas the skin are separated in another barrel. The skin of the fruits are then stored in the airtight barrel for about another two weeks. Yeast (marcha) and other chemicals required for fermentation are added during this period. After the fermentation process is complete, the mixture is boiled and the steam is collected as the final product.

Sales 
Most of the brandy distilleries of the region are owned and operated by the local Thakali people. As of 2019, there were six commercial distilleries in the Marpha village. Mustang is a remote district in the western part of Nepal near the Tibetan plateau. The major source of income of the region are tourism and agriculture. The various product produced from the fruits are exported to various region of the country as well as the world. Marpha brandy has also become a popular souvenir item that tourist buy for their friends and families back home.

References 
Alcohol in Nepal
Fruit brandies